Bizarre Fruit is the third album by British dance band M People. It was released on 14 November 1994 and charted and peaked at No. 4 on the UK Albums Chart, spending one year on the chart before an expanded version of the album, Bizarre Fruit II, was released a year later. In 1996 it was announced that Bizarre Fruit had reached 1.1 million copies sold worldwide. The albums Bizarre Fruit and Bizarre Fruit II were certified 5× platinum in the UK for sales of 1.5 million.

The album's two most popular singles were "Sight for Sore Eyes", which reached No. 6 on the UK Singles Chart and "Search for the Hero", which peaked at No. 9 on the same chart. Other singles released from this album were "Open Your Heart" (No. 9), "Love Rendezvous" (No. 32) and "Itchycoo Park" (No. 11) from the re-released album. In the US, remixes for the song "Padlock" were supplied to club DJs and appeared as the B-side to the CD maxi single of "Search for the Hero". The track reached No. 13 on the Billboard Dance chart.

Critical reception
AllMusic editor William Cooper stated that Bizarre Fruit is "chock-full of funky house grooves", and Heather Small's "deep, soulful vocals add just the right touch to the mix". He highlighted songs like "Open Your Heart", "Sight for Sore Eyes", "Search for the Hero" and "Precious Pearl". Peter Galvin from Entertainment Weekly viewed the album as a "irrepressible" follow-up to Elegant Slumming, concluding that it "has more than its share of house-quaking grooves."

Track listing

Charts

Weekly charts

Year-end charts

Certifications

Release history

References

1994 albums
M People albums